This is a list of uncrewed spaceflights to Mir. Components of the space station are indicated in green.

A.  - Time from docking until debris impact in the Pacific Ocean at approximately 05:59 GMT on 23 March 2001.
B.  - From time of launch
C.  - Remained attached during deorbit of space station on 23 March 2001.
D.  - Decayed naturally

See also
Mir
List of Progress flights
List of human spaceflights to Mir
List of human spaceflights to the International Space Station
Uncrewed spaceflights to the International Space Station
List of Mir spacewalks

References

Mir, uncrewed spaceflights
Uncrewed spacecraft
Mir